Puvaneswaran Ramasamy (born December 8, 1974) is a Malaysian karateka who is best known for being the only person to win medals in Karate at the Asian Games at five consecutive tournaments.

Honour

Honour of Malaysia
 : Member of the Order of the Defender of the Realm (A.M.N.) (2003)

References

1974 births
Living people
Malaysian male karateka
Asian Games medalists in karate
Karateka at the 1994 Asian Games
Karateka at the 1998 Asian Games
Karateka at the 2002 Asian Games
Karateka at the 2006 Asian Games
Karateka at the 2010 Asian Games
Malaysian Muslims
Malaysian people of Indian descent
Sportspeople from Kuala Lumpur
Asian Games gold medalists for Malaysia
Asian Games silver medalists for Malaysia
Asian Games bronze medalists for Malaysia
Medalists at the 1994 Asian Games
Medalists at the 2002 Asian Games
Medalists at the 2006 Asian Games
Medalists at the 2010 Asian Games
Southeast Asian Games gold medalists for Malaysia
Southeast Asian Games silver medalists for Malaysia
Southeast Asian Games medalists in karate
Members of the Order of the Defender of the Realm
Competitors at the 2007 Southeast Asian Games
Islamic Solidarity Games competitors for Malaysia
20th-century Malaysian people
21st-century Malaysian people